was a Japanese court noble of the Edo period. He held the regent position of kampaku from 1795-1814.

Biography 
Masahiro was born the son of regent Takatsukasa Sukehira.

He served as kampaku from 1795-1814.

He had a son, Masamichi, with the daughter of the 11th head of Tokushima Domain, Hachisuka Shigeyoshi.

References
 

1761 births
1841 deaths
Fujiwara clan
Takatsukasa family